César Octavio Pedroza Gaitán (born 20 May 1959) is a Mexican politician affiliated with the PAN. He was a senator in the LXII and LXIII Legislatures of the Mexican Congress from the state of San Luis Potosí. He also served as a federal deputy during the LXI Legislature and was the mayor of the city of San Luis Potosí from 2004 to 2006.

References

1959 births
Living people
People from San Luis Potosí City
Members of the Senate of the Republic (Mexico)
Members of the Chamber of Deputies (Mexico)
National Action Party (Mexico) politicians
21st-century Mexican politicians
Politicians from San Luis Potosí
Autonomous University of San Luis Potosi alumni